Destin is a given name and a surname. Notable persons with the name include:

Given name
 Destin Damachoua (born 1986), Central African-French basketball player
 Destin Daniel Cretton (born 1978), American film director, screenwriter, producer, and editor
 Destin Destine (1895-?), Haitian sport shooter
 Destin Hall (born 1987), American attorney and politician
 Destin Hood (born 1990), American MLB player
 Destin Makita (born 1984), Republic of the Congo football (soccer) player
 Destin Makumbu (born 1982), English former professional footballer
 Destin Onka Malonga (1988–2016), Congolese football (soccer) player
 Destin Route (born 1990), American rapper, known as JID
 Destin Sandlin (born 1981), American YouTube educator

Surname